The Mosque al-Nour (also known as Mosque an-Nour;  or ) is a mosque in Mulhouse, France. It was launched in 2009 for the construction of a religious and cultural center for the Muslim community in Mulhouse, the second largest city in the Alsace region.

Kuwait and Qatar are the main funders of this project, administered by AMAL (Association des Musulmans d’Alsace, Alsace Muslim Association), a prominent Muslim association established in Mulhouse in 1973 with the goal of advocating for a place of worship for the local Muslim community as well as for their education, and social, cultural and economic engagement.

Project development and timeline 
The project for the Centre al-Nour revolving around the Mosque al-Nour was developed as a consequence of the expansion of the Muslim community in Mulhouse as well as of the city's urban renewal, that will lead to the demolition of the current facilities hosting AMAL's activities.

The first AMAL facilities, including a mosque with 2000-seat capacity, three classrooms, a butcher's shop and a bookstore, was established at 41, rue Neppert 68100 in Mulhouse, where it is currently located.

The new mosque was designed to be the center of the new building hosting the Centre al-Nour, which will be located at 178, rue d’Alsace. The center will be developed on three floors and will occupy 11000 m2 (118403 ft²).(1)(2)(4) It will host several business companies, including a supermarket, a hair salon, a swimming pool, a spa with a gym. The Centre al-Nour will also host several schools and education centers, as well as a funeral parlor.

The Mosque al-Nour will have a 2,300-seat capacity, and will be organized in two spacious prayer rooms, one for men (1358 m2, 14,617 ft²) and one for women (843 m2, 9,073 ft²).

Construction works, launched in March 2010, were suspended for three years (2011-2014) but were recently resumed at full speed in 2014.(4) Construction is expected to be completed by 2017.

Costs and funding 
The cost of the project increased exponentially over the years, and although no official figure is available, several sources assess that the Mosque al-Nour and the Centre al-Nour will cost between €9 million and €11 million.

The construction of the Mosque al-Nour as well as the whole center relies on Muslim donations only, being France a secular state that does not authorize financial support to religions and cults. L’Alsace quoted Nasser El Kady, AMAL Vice-President  in charge of monitoring the construction works, as declaring that the project supporters have collected over €8 million since 2009.

The collection of donations has taken place primarily through the project website, and has benefited from the public support of prominent sponsors, such as Yusuf al-Qaradawi. However, L’Alsace reported that about €5 million were donated by wealthy benefactors from abroad, primarily from Qatar and Kuwait.

The Consortium Against Terrorist Finance registered that Qatar contributed about €2 million to the project through Qatar Charity, Qatar's largest NGO. In fact, among Qatar Charity's worldwide activities is "Ghaith", an initiative launched in 2014 to "serve Islamic project worldwide" under the supervision of Qatari preacher Ahmed Al Hammadi.

Besides supporting financially Islamic cultural institutions and organizations, Qatar Charity's website describes the scope of the initiative as finalized to "introduce Islamic culture and strengthen its presence among Western communities in particular, and the world in general." According to Qatar Charity, "Ghaith" initiative "aspires to be the first patron that empowers Islamic culture in the West" and supports Islamic communities in all France as well as across Europe, in the U.S., Canada, and Australia.

Criticism and allegations 
The Mosque al-Nour has faced harsh criticism mostly related to disputable profiles of its architectural plan and its cost. Some Muslim voices have condemned the "unnecessarily majestic" project which does not address the necessity of the local community of Islamic faith in Mulhouse, in need of two or three smaller mosques integrated with the life of the local community the cost of which would not exceed €1 million.

The lack of financial accountability and especially the absence of public financial records related to donations from Qatar as well as the alleged financial mismanagement of the project were at the center of several debates in France.

Moreover, the Communauté Francophone de Confession Musulmane (CFCM, the Francophone Community of Islamic Faith) denounced the project as a "political" operation that will allow the Muslim Brotherhood to gain political leverage and a stronghold in Mulhouse. AMAL is affiliated with the UOIF (Union des Organisations Islamiques de France, the Union of Islamic Organizations of France), an umbrella organization including over 250 Muslim entities on French soil with strong ties to the Muslim Brotherhood.

On their website, CFCM stated that the Mulhouse mayor sold AMAL the plot of land for the Mosque al-Nour and the Centre al-Nour for €240,000, and decided to grant the organization a subsidy for the same amount without holding any consultation with other Muslim organizations in Mulhouse or with other organizations representing civic society. CFCM primarily questioned the unilateral decision of Mulhouse authorities to make the Mosque al-Nour and the Centre al-Nour a private property owned by AMAL and indirectly by the UOIF. The fact that the Mosque al-Nour and the Centre al-Nour – and by extension the Muslim Brotherhood-affiliated AMAL - will benefit from taxpayers’ money is "unfair and dishonest," CFCM claimed.

Moreover, in a 2013 piece published by L’Opinion French journalist Nathalie Segaune voiced concerns about the public support to the project by Yusuf al-Qaradawi, a well-known preacher whose strong ties to the Muslim Brotherhood and to extremist organizations costed him the possibility to access the U.S. (1999), the UK (2008) and France (2012). Qatar Charity itself has a long track-record of controversial ties to extremist and terrorist organizations.

Finally, the Consortium Against Terrorist Finance (CATF) described Qatar's efforts to fund mosques and cultural institutes across Europe and worldwide as part of the Gulf country's struggle to compete with Saudi Arabia in spreading Salafism and "claiming new territory."

References

Buildings and structures in Mulhouse
Nour